The 2007–08 Czech 2. Liga was the 15th season of the 2. česká fotbalová liga, the second tier of the Czech football league.

Team changes

From 2. Liga
Promoted to Czech First League
 FK Viktoria Žižkov
 Bohemians 1905

Relegated to Moravian-Silesian Football League
 Sigma Olomouc "B"
 Dosta Bystrc

Relegated to Bohemian Football League
 Blšany

Relegated to 1.A třída (level 6)
 Jakubčovice

To 2. Liga
Relegated from Czech First League
 FK Marila Příbram
 1. FC Slovácko

Promoted from Bohemian Football League
 FK Bohemians Praha (Střížkov)
 SK Sparta Krč

Promoted from Moravian-Silesian Football League
 Fotbal Fulnek

Promoted
 FK Dukla Prague

League table

Top goalscorers

See also
 2007–08 Czech First League
 2007–08 Czech Cup

References

Official website 

Czech 2. Liga seasons
Czech
2007–08 in Czech football